Mukesh Nayak is an Indian politician and a member of the Indian National Congress party.

Political career
He became an MLA in 2013.

Personal life
He is married to Mrs. Shashi Kiran Nayak, and has one son and one daughter.

See also
Madhya Pradesh Legislative Assembly
2013 Madhya Pradesh Legislative Assembly election
1993 Madhya Pradesh Legislative Assembly election
1985 Madhya Pradesh Legislative Assembly election

References

External links

1957 births
Living people
Indian National Congress politicians from Madhya Pradesh